CyberShack is Australia’s only television program dedicated entirely to the consumer technology and home entertainment market. It provides a wealth of content; from gadgets to games to lifestyle and entertainment products. CyberShack features relevant and updated information to a mass target audience.

It airs on the Nine Network nationally and resumed broadcasting in October, 2011.

Hosts
Kristy Hocking (2017–present)
Sara Issaka (2017–present)
Rupert Raineri (2018–present)
Christian Heath (2018–present)
Faustina Agolley (2006–2007)
 Erin McNaught (2007–2010)
 Charlie Brown (2006–present)
 Ashley Cheadle (2010)
 Janis McGavin (2010)
 Josh Phillipps (2015–2018)
 Courtney Dober (2017–2018)

References
 http://www.cybershack.com/
 http://www.tvtonight.com.au/2010/10/ashley-joins-cybershack-tv.html
 https://www.imdb.com/title/tt1083876/

Australian factual television series
Network 10 original programming
Nine Network original programming
2006 Australian television series debuts
2010s Australian television series